Slow movement may refer to:

Slow movement (music)
Slow movement (culture)
Bradykinesia, "slow movement", a symptom of Parkinson's disease

See also